The Virus is a 2013 South Korean television series starring Um Ki-joon, Lee So-jung, Lee Ki-woo, and Jo Hee-bong. It aired on OCN from March 1 to May 3, 2013, on Fridays at 22:00 for 10 episodes.

Plot
Lee Myung-hyun and his disease control task force investigate a mutant virus that has a 100% fatality rate and kills the infected within three days. Not only must they find an antidote, they must also stop the epidemic from spreading and killing all of mankind.

Cast
 Um Ki-joon as Lee Myung-hyun
 Lee So-jung as Jeon Ji-won
 Lee Ki-woo as Kim Se-jin
 Ahn Suk-hwan as Kim Do-jin
 Jo Hee-bong as Go Soo-kil
 Kim Yu-bin as Lee Joo-young
 Park Min-woo as Bong Sun-dong
 Hyun Woo as Kim In-chul
 Oh Yong as Jung Woo-jin
 Song Young-kyu as Yoon Il-joong

International broadcast
It aired in Japan on cable channel KNTV from October 23 to November 21, 2013, and was re-aired on cable channel BS-Japan.

References

External links
 

OCN television dramas
2013 South Korean television series debuts
2013 South Korean television series endings
South Korean medical television series
South Korean thriller television series
Korean-language television shows
Television series by JS Pictures
Television series about viral outbreaks